On Indian Railways, the MEMUs are electric multiple unit (EMU) trains that serve short and medium-distance routes in India, as compared to normal EMU trains that connect urban and suburban areas. The acronym stands for Mainline Electric Multiple Unit.

History 

Indian Railways (IR) started MEMU service on Asansol – Adra section on 15 July 1995 and on Kharagpur – Tata section on 22 July 1995. Delhi-Panipat MEMU service started on 27 September 1995. Raipur–Durg–Bhatapara–Raipur–Bilaspur MEMU service started on 17 October 1995. Arakkonam-Jolarpettai MEMU service on 22 May 2000. Bankura-Midnapore MEMU started on 30 June 2000. The first 20 coach MEMU ran between Surat to Virar in 2017. Since 2019, 3-phase MEMUs have started replacing existing MEMU rakes.

IR is progressively replacing all locomotive-hauled slow and fast passenger and intercity trains with EMUs. The upgraded trains are re-branded as MEMUs.

Operation 
The system uses multiple electrical units operating on 25 kV AC drawn from overhead lines. The trailer coaches have two toilets for passengers and one for the crew.

The motorcoaches use DC traction motors. In 2017, ICF flagged off an LHB hybrid AC-AC MEMU rake based on the 1,600 HP Medha DEMU architecture. These rakes use asynchronous traction motors and have a maximum designed speed of 110 km/h. These use a stainless steel body. Two of them operate on South Central Railways.

ICF launched new MEMUs capable to operate at 110–130 km/hr. The construction cost is  26 crore per unit and can carry 2,618 passengers. This train has a three phase traction motor and operates on 25 kV current which saves 35% energy. It offers GPS-based passenger information systems and announcement in coaches. It has double leaf sliding doors, gangways, CCTV cameras and aluminium luggage racks. The driver's cabin has AC and the coach has an emergency communication facility. The train may start in February 2019.

Manufacturing 
MEMUs are manufactured at Rail Coach Factory, Kapurthala, and Integral Coach Factory, Chennai. Rakes are maintained in the Titlagarh coach maintenance shops.
Marathwada Rail Coach Factory, Latur is currently trying to ramp up production capacity of 250 MEMU coaches per annum.

Gallery

Comparison to locomotive-hauled trains

See also
 High-speed rail in India
 Express trains in India
 Slow and fast passenger trains in India
 Suburban trains

References

External links

 MEMU/DEMU Electric/Diesel Multiple Unit Shuttle Trains - Railway Enquiry
 Indian Railways Fan Club Photo Gallery: MEMU